Alize Espiridiona Cenda del Castillo (14 December 1869 – 11 December 1945), known on stage as Chiquita, was a Cuban dwarf singer and performer.

At 26 inches tall, she had built for her by C. Francis Jenkins what was in 1901 then the smallest automobile ever built.

Cenda was married and had one child, which weighed no more than two pounds and died at an early age.

Cenda spoke Spanish, Italian and English.

Cuban author Antonio Orlando Rodríguez won the Premio Alfaguara for his 2008 novel Chiquita, based on the life of Espiridiona Cenda.

References

Entertainers with dwarfism
1869 births
1945 deaths